Indigofera pendula, the weeping indigo, is a species of flowering plant in the family Fabaceae, native to south-central China. Its cultivar 'Shangri-la' has gained the Royal Horticultural Society's Award of Garden Merit.

References

pendula
Endemic flora of China
Flora of South-Central China
Plants described in 1889